CFAV Glenevis (YTB 642) is a Glen class naval tugboat operated by the Royal Canadian Navy. Built at Georgetown Shipyard, Georgetown, Prince Edward Island, and launched in 1976, the ship was delivered on 9 August 1976. Attached to Maritime Forces Atlantic, the ship is based at CFB Halifax.

References

Fleet of the Royal Canadian Navy
1976 ships
Glen-class tugs (1975)
Auxiliary ships of the Royal Canadian Navy